Jeffrey Frans (born 11 February 1952) is a South African former cricketer. He played in 55 first-class matches for Eastern Province from 1973/74 to 1987/88.

See also
 List of Eastern Province representative cricketers

References

External links
 

1952 births
Living people
South African cricketers
Eastern Province cricketers
People from Mossel Bay
Cricketers from the Western Cape